Bahram VII (Middle Persian: Wahrām) was the son of Yazdegerd III, the last Shahanshah of the Sasanian Empire. After the death of his father at Merv in 651, Bahram fled to China along with many other Sasanian nobles, where he and his brother Peroz III asked the Chinese Emperor Gaozong to support them in their fight against the Arabs. Bahram repeatedly tried to recapture the occupied Iranian territories from the Arabs, which he did not succeed in.

Some identify the aristocrat Aluohan as Bahram VII. According to a Chinese scholar, the so-called Nanmei, whose statue was erected together with that of Peroz III in Qianling Mausoleum, should be identified with Aluohan.

The figure Wahrām-ī-Warȷā̌wand in late Pahlavi literature may point to Bahram VII.

Bahram died in 710 in his private domicile in Luoyang.

Bahram VII's son, Prince Khosrau, recorded as Juluo in Chinese source, continued his father's military efforts. However, Khosrau's campaigns and his first successful invasion into Persia were eventually unsuccessful. He is probably the same Khosrow mentioned by al-Tabari.

References

Sources 
 Touraj Daryaee: Sasanian Iran. Mazda Publishers, California, 2008, S. 91–104.
 D. N. MacKenzie: A Concise Pahlavi Dictionary. Routledge Curzon, 2005.

Sasanian princes
Tang dynasty generals
7th-century Iranian people
710 deaths
Year of birth unknown
8th-century Iranian people